The Reich Forestry Office was the highest authority for forestry, hunting, timber management, nature conservation, and the preservation of natural monuments in Nazi Germany. It was established by the Law on the Transition of Forestry and Hunting to the Reich, which was passed unanimously by the Reich government on July 3, 1934. Its aim was to preserve forested areas due to their importance to the nation's culture and industry.

At the head of the authority was the Reichsforstmeister with the rank of Reich Minister, though in hunting-related matters the designation Reichsjägermeister was used. The various regional forest offices were made subordinate to the new authority. Forestry and hunting were spun off from the Reich Ministry of Food and Agriculture in 1934 and placed under the Reich Forestry Office. In 1935 it was merged with the Prussian State Forest Office.

Literature 
 Dirscherl, Stefan: Tier- und Naturschutz im Nationalsozialismus, Göttingen: V & R Unipress, 2012, S. 73–75.
 Rubner, Heinrich: Deutsche Forstgeschichte 1933-1945: Forstwirtschaft, Jagd, und Umwelt im NS-Staat, St. Katharinen: Scripta-Mercaturae-Verl., 1985.
 How Green Were the Nazis? Nature, Environment and Nation in the Third Reich Edited by Franz-Josef Brüggemeier, Mark Cioc, and Thomas Zeller. Athens: Ohio University Press, 2005

References 

Forestry in Germany
Government agencies established in 1934
1934 establishments in Germany